David Roger Marples (born October 17, 1952) is a British-born Canadian historian and Distinguished University Professor at the Department of History & Classics, University of Alberta. He specializes in history and contemporary politics of Belarus, Russia and Ukraine.

Education
Marples initially attended Keele University, studying English and Sociology, but transferred after one year to Westfield College, which was part of the University of London, in order to be nearer his fiancee. He received his BA Honours from the University of London in 1975, his MA in History from the University of Alberta in 1980, and Ph.D. in Economic and Social History from the University of Sheffield in 1985. The title of his Ph.D. dissertation was Collectivization of agriculture in Western Ukraine 1944-1951.

Career
Marples is a former President of The North American Association for Belarusian Studies (2010–15) and was formerly Director of the Stasiuk Program on Contemporary Ukraine at the Canadian Institute of Ukrainian Studies (2004–14), University of Alberta. 

He is regarded as one of the leading Western authorities on the Chernobyl nuclear catastrophe (social and political aspects).

Publications

  The War in Ukraine's Donbas (edited) (Budapest: Central European University Press, 2022). 248 pp.
 Understanding Ukraine and Belarus (Bristol-E-International Relations Publishing, 2020). 191 pp.
 Hiroshima-75: Nuclear Issues in Global Contexts (Stuttgart: Ibidem Verlag, 2020). Co-edited with Aya Fujiwara. 306 pp. 
 Ukraine in Conflict: An Analytical Chronicle (Bristol, UK: E-International Relations publishing, 2017). 222 pp. 
Ukraine's Euromaidan: Analyses of a Civil Revolution in Ukraine. Co edited with Frederick V. Mills. Stuttgart Germany: ibidem Verlag and Columbia University Press, 2015. 285 pp.
Our Glorious Past': Lukashenka's Belarus and the Great Patriotic War (Ibidem-Verlag, Hannover, Germany, 2014) 
Holodomor: Causes of the Famine of 1932-1933 in Ukraine (Heritage Press, 2011)
Russia in the Twentieth Century: the Quest for Stability (Harlow, UK: Pearson-Longman, 2011), 410 pp.
Heroes and Villains: Creating National History in Contemporary Ukraine (Budapest and New York: Central European University Press, 2007 cloth, 2008 paperback.
The Lukashenka Phenomenon: Elections, Propaganda, and the Foundations of Political Authority in Belarus (Trondheim, Norway: Trondheim Studies on East European Cultures and Societies, No. 21, 2007).
Prospects for Democracy in Belarus (Washington, DC: GMFUS-Heinrich Boll, 2006) [Co-edited with Joerg Forbrig and Pavol Demes]. Second revised edition published later in the same year.
The Collapse of the Soviet Union, 1985-1991 (Harlow, Essex: Pearson Education-Longman, 2004)
Motherland: Russia in the 20th Century (London: Longman, 2002)
Lenin's Revolution: Russia 1917-1921 (London: Wesley, Addison, and Longman, 2000)
Belarus: A Denationalized Nation (Amsterdam: Harwood Academic Publishers, 1999)
Nuclear Energy and Security in the Former Soviet Union (Boulder, CO: Westview Press, 1997) [co-edited with Marilyn J. Young]
Belarus: From Soviet Rule to Nuclear Catastrophe (Basingstoke, UK: Macmillan Press; New York, N.Y.: St. Martin's Press; and Edmonton, AB: The University of Alberta Press, 1996).
Stalinism in Ukraine in the 1940s (London: The Macmillan Press, 1992)
Ukraine Under Perestroika: Ecology, Economics, and the Workers' Revolt (London: The Macmillan Press, 1991)
The Social Impact of the Chernobyl Disaster (London: The Macmillan Press, 1988)
Chernobyl & Nuclear Power in the USSR (London: The Macmillan Press, 1987).

Personal life 
Marples is married. He has four children.

Notes

Bibliography

 

1952 births
Living people
20th-century Canadian historians
People from Chesterfield, Derbyshire
Academic staff of the University of Alberta
University of Alberta alumni
Alumni of the University of Sheffield
21st-century Canadian historians